Prapol Pongpanich (18 September 1952 – 3 February 2012) was a Thai football coach. He led the side to the Thailand Premier League 2008 league title. In 2010, he became head coach of Thai Premier League team Bangkok United.

Honours
As Head Coach
Thailand Premier League Champions : 2008 with Provincial Electricity Authority FC
Coach of the Year 2008 with Provincial Electricity Authority FC

References

Prapol Pongpanich
1963 births
2012 deaths
Prapol Pongpanich